Grand Duke Michael  may refer to:

 Grand Duke Michael Alexandrovich of Russia (1878–1918), youngest son of Tsar Alexander III of Russia
 Grand Duke Michael Mikhailovich of Russia (1861–1929), second son of Grand Duke Michael Nikolaievich of Russia
 Grand Duke Michael Nikolaevich of Russia (1832–1909), fourth son of Tsar Nicholas I of Russia
 Grand Duke Michael Pavlovich of Russia (1798–1849), fourth son of Tsar Paul I of Russia
 Prince Franz Wilhelm of Prussia (born 1943), German businessman who due to marriage was styled Grand Duke Mikhail Pavlovich of Russia from 1976 to 1986